= The Centennial (Troy) =

Office building in Michigan, United States

Coordinates: 42.5622°N 83.1461°W

The Centennial, also known as the SBC Publishing Building or 100 North Center, is a tall office building in Troy, Michigan. It is located at 100 E. Big Beaver Road, North of I-75.

The high-rise was built in 1981 and finished in 1983. It stands at 16 stories in total height, with 15 above-ground floors, and 1 basement floor. Official measurements state that the building stands 207 ft (63m) in total height. The building is used for offices for SBC and was designed in the modern architectural style.

== Description ==
- This building is shaped like a parallelogram.
